Thakur Mool Chand Chauhan is an Indian politician and was a member of the 16th Legislative Assembly of Uttar Pradesh of India. He represented the Dhampur constituency of Uttar Pradesh and is a member of the Samajwadi Party political party....Recently He joined Bahujan Samaj Party.

Early life and education
Thakur Mool Chand Chauhan was born in Bijnor district, Uttar Pradesh. He holds an under graduate degree in economics. Before being elected as MLA, he used to work as an agriculturist.

Political career
Thakur Mool Chand Chauhan has been an MLA for three terms. During all his three terms, he represented the Dhampur constituency as a member of the Samajwadi Party. Chauhan was also a minister in the Government of Uttar Pradesh.

He lost his seat in the 2017 Uttar Pradesh Assembly election to Ashok Kumar Rana of the Bharatiya Janata Party....Recently He joined Bahujan samaj party.

Posts Held

See also
Dhampur
Uttar Pradesh Legislative Assembly
Government of India
Politics of India
Samajwadi Party

References 

Samajwadi Party politicians
Uttar Pradesh MLAs 2012–2017
Uttar Pradesh MLAs 1997–2002
Uttar Pradesh MLAs 2002–2007
People from Bijnor district
1951 births
Living people